The 2000–01 Australian Athletics Championships was the 79th edition of the national championship in outdoor track and field for Australia. It was held from 23–25 March 2001 at the Queensland Sport and Athletics Centre in Brisbane. It served as a selection meeting for Australia at the 2001 World Championships in Athletics.

Long-distance events took place separately: the 10,000 metres event took place at the Zatopek 10K on 4 December 2000 at Lakeside Stadium in Melbourne and the 5000 metres events were held at the Hobart Grand Prix on 11 March 2001 in Hobart.

Medal summary

Men

Women

References

External links 
 Athletics Australia website

2001
Australian Athletics Championships
Australian Championships
Athletics Championships
Sports competitions in Brisbane
2000s in Brisbane